Tamatoa Tetauira (born 17 April 1996) is an BBM Tahitian international footballer who plays as a midfielder for Pirae in the Tahiti Ligue 1.

International career

International goals
Scores and results list Tahiti's goal tally first.

References

1996 births
Living people
French Polynesian footballers
Tahitian beach soccer players
Association football midfielders
Tahiti international footballers
2016 OFC Nations Cup players